Zilwaukee is a city in Saginaw County in the U.S. state of Michigan. The 2020 census places the population at 1,534. The city is adjacent to and was created from Zilwaukee Township.  It is the home of the Zilwaukee Bridge.

History
Zilwaukee was founded in 1848 when Daniel and Solomon Johnson, two brothers from New York City, built a saw mill there.

The provenance of the town's name is unknown, but local legends hold that it was a deliberate attempt to attract immigrants who thought they were heading for the larger Milwaukee, Wisconsin.

Geography

Demographics

2010 census
As of the census of 2010, there were 1,658 people, 671 households, and 442 families living in the city. The racial makeup of the city was 92.3% White, 3.7% African American, 0.5% Native American, 0.3% Asian, 1.6% from other races, and 1.6% from two or more races. Hispanic or Latino of any race were 7.7% of the population.

There were 671 households, of which 30.4% had children under the age of 18 living with them, 50.1% were married couples living together, 10.7% had a female householder with no husband present, 5.1% had a male householder with no wife present, and 34.1% were non-families. 27.3% of all households were made up of individuals, and 12.2% had someone living alone who was 65 years of age or older. The average household size was 2.47 and the average family size was 2.97.

The median age in the city was 40 years. 22.1% of residents were under the age of 18; 9.8% were between the ages of 18 and 24; 25.8% were from 25 to 44; 25.6% were from 45 to 64; and 16.6% were 65 years of age or older. The gender makeup of the city was 49.8% male and 50.2% female.

2000 census
As of the census of 2000, there were 1,799 people, 711 households, and 509 families living in the city. The racial makeup of the city was 93.94% White, 1.78% African American, 0.44% Native American, 0.50% Asian, 2.61% from other races, and 0.72% from two or more races. Hispanic or Latino of any race were 6.23% of the population.

There were 711 households, out of which 28.1% had children under the age of 18 living with them, 57.8% were married couples living together, 10.4% had a female householder with no husband present, and 28.3% were non-families. 22.9% of all households were made up of individuals, and 9.1% had someone living alone who was 65 years of age or older.  The average household size was 2.53 and the average family size was 2.98.

In the city, the population was spread out, with 23.5% under the age of 18, 6.7% from 18 to 24, 31.2% from 25 to 44, 24.5% from 45 to 64, and 14.2% who were 65 years of age or older.  The median age was 37 years. For every 100 females, there were 95.3 males.  For every 100 females age 18 and over, there were 93.7 males.

The median income for a household in the city was $42,014, and the median income for a family was $47,981. Males had a median income of $37,292 versus $25,586 for females. The per capita income for the city was $19,491.  About 5.7% of families and 6.4% of the population were below the poverty line, including 10.4% of those under age 18 and 5.8% of those age 65 or over.

References

External links

Cities in Saginaw County, Michigan
Populated places established in 1848
1848 establishments in Michigan